{{Album ratings
| rev1 = Allmusic
| rev1Score = 
| rev2 = Christgau's Consumer Guide 
| rev2score = A−
| rev3 = The New Rolling Stone Album Guide
| rev3score = 
| rev4 = Rolling Stone
| rev4Score = <ref>{{cite journal |url=https://www.rollingstone.com/music/albumreviews/westing-by-musket-and-sextant-19930902 |title=Westing (By Musket and Sextant) |first=Arion |last=Berger |date=2 September 1993 |magazine=Rolling Stone }}</ref>
| rev5 = Spin| rev5score = 
}}Westing (By Musket and Sextant) is a compilation of the early EPs and singles by American indie rock band Pavement.  It features all the tracks from their first three EPs, Slay Tracks (1933–1969), Demolition Plot J-7, and Perfect Sound Forever, as well as the single mix of "Summer Babe," its B-sides, and two compilation tracks.

Track listing
All tracks are written by Stephen Malkmus and Scott Kannberg.

 Slay Tracks: 1933–19691. "You're Killing Me – 3:20
2. "Box Elder – 2:26
3. "Maybe Maybe – 2:14
4. "She Believes – 3:02
5. "Price Yeah! – 3:00Demolition Plot J-76. "Forklift" – 3:27
7. "Spizzle Trunk" – 1:23
8. "Recorder Grot" – 2:08
9. "Internal K-Dart" – 1:51
10. "Perfect Depth" – 2:43
11. "Recorder Grot (Rally)" – 0:21
 Perfect Sound Forever:
12. "Heckler Spray" – 1:06
13. "From Now On" – 2:03
14. "Angel Carver Blues/Mellow Jazz Docent" – 2:30
15. "Drive-by Fader" – 0:28
16. "Debris Slide" – 1:56
17. "Home" – 2:23
18. "Krell Vid-User" – 1:26
 Summer Babe single:
19. "Summer Babe" – 3:13
20. "Mercy Snack: The Laundromat" – 1:39
21. "Baptist Blacktick" – 2:03
 Compilation appearances:
22. "My First Mine" – 2:20
23. "My Radio" – 1:21

 Personnel 

 Pavement 

 Stephen Malkmus – lead vocals (tracks 1–14, 16–23), guitar (tracks 1–23), keyboard (tracks 1,6, 9), synthesizer (tracks 5, 9), bass guitar (track 2), percussion (tracks 3,6)
 Scott Kannberg – guitar (tracks 2–14, 16–23), bass guitar (tracks 12–14, 16–18), drums (tracks 3-4), trombone (track 4), keyboard (track 7), synthesizer (track 9)
 Gary Young – drums (tracks 2, 4–5, 12–14, 16–23)

References
Jovanovic, Rob (2004). Perfect Sound Forever: The Story of Pavement''. (Boston) Justin, Charles & Co. .

External links
 Westing (By Musket and Sextant) at Drag City
 
 

1993 compilation albums
Pavement (band) albums
Drag City (record label) compilation albums
Domino Recording Company compilation albums
Flying Nun Records compilation albums
Big Cat Records compilation albums